Oxazolidinedione may refer to:
 2,4-Oxazolidinedione, parent of various drugs
 2,5-Oxazolidinedione, also called glycine N-carboxyanhydride